Club Tiburones Femenil was a Mexican women's football club based in Veracruz City, Veracruz, Mexico. The club was the female section of Tiburones Rojos de Veracruz between 2017 and 2019. The team played in the Liga MX Femenil which started in July 2017.

Players

Current squad
As of 6 August 2017

References

Liga MX Femenil teams
Association football clubs established in 2017
Women's association football clubs in Mexico
2017 establishments in Mexico